The 1964 Utah Redskins football team was an American football team that represented the University of Utah as a member of the Western Athletic Conference (WAC) during the 1964 NCAA University Division football season. In their seventh season under head coach Ray Nagel, the Redskins compiled an overall record of 9–2 with a mark of 3–1 against conference opponents, sharing the WAC title with Arizona New Mexico. Led by quarterback Pokey Allen, running back Ron Coleman, and receiver Roy Jefferson, Utah defeated West Virginia  in the Liberty Bowl, played indoors in at the Atlantic City Convention Hall in Atlantic City, New Jersey. Home games were played on campus at Ute Stadium in Salt Lake City.

Schedule

After the season

NFL draft
Four players were selected in the 1965 NFL Draft.

References

Utah
Utah Utes football seasons
Liberty Bowl champion seasons
Western Athletic Conference football champion seasons
Utah Redskins football